Oxylia is a genus of longhorn beetles of the subfamily Lamiinae, containing the following species:

 Oxylia argentata (Ménetriés, 1832)
 Oxylia duponcheli (Brullé, 1833)

References

Saperdini